Erwin Stührk (4 July 1910 – 13 November 1942) was a German international footballer who played as a defender.

Personal life
Stührk served as a Gefreiter (private) in the German Army during the Second World War.  He was killed in action on the Eastern Front on 13 November 1942.

References

1910 births
1942 deaths
Association football defenders
German footballers
Germany international footballers
Eimsbütteler TV players
German Army personnel killed in World War II
German Army soldiers of World War II
Footballers from Hamburg
Military personnel from Hamburg